Reino Ala-Kulju (25 April 1898 – 5 August 1983) was a Finnish Lutheran clergyman, secondary school teacher and politician, born in Kuortane. He was a member of the Parliament of Finland, representing the Patriotic People's Movement (IKL) from 1933 to 1939 and the National Coalition Party from 1952 to 1954 and from 1959 to 1966. Eveliina Ala-Kulju was his mother.

References

1898 births
1983 deaths
People from Kuortane
People from Vaasa Province (Grand Duchy of Finland)
20th-century Finnish Lutheran clergy
Patriotic People's Movement (Finland) politicians
National Coalition Party politicians
Members of the Parliament of Finland (1933–36)
Members of the Parliament of Finland (1936–39)
Members of the Parliament of Finland (1951–54)
Members of the Parliament of Finland (1958–62)
Members of the Parliament of Finland (1962–66)
Finnish military personnel of World War II
University of Helsinki alumni
Finnish fascists